Uduwela may refer to the following villages in Sri Lanka
Uduwela Pallegama 
Uduwela Udagama